The Bichvinta Four Gospels is a 12th-century illuminated manuscript of the Four Gospels in Georgian, copied in the nuskhuri script. It is named after the cathedral church in Abkhazia, where the book was discovered in 1830. The manuscript is now at the Georgian National Center of Manuscripts, Tbilisi, as H-2120.

Description and history 
The Bichvinta Gospels manuscript consists of 230 folios, 31 x 23 cm. in size. The text is written in the Georgian nuskhuri script, in two columns. The manuscript is adorned with two miniature paintings of the evangelists Mark and Luke, headpieces, and historiated initials in the "capital" asomtavruli script.  

The manuscript is placed in a silver cover, which was commissioned—as an accompanying inscription relates—by the Shervashidze princes, Solomon and his son Arzakan, for the Bichvinta Cathedral of the Theotokos on the occasion of their victory on the side of the king of Imereti and Dadiani against Gurieli and Liparit Dadiani, possibly at the battle of Bandza in June 1658.

The manuscript was discovered as laid open on the altar of the then-abandoned Bichvinta Cathedral by the Russian army soldiers upon their conquest of the area in 1830. The manuscript was taken to the Public Library in St. Petersburg and subsequently transferred to the Georgian National Center of Manuscripts in Tbilisi.

See also 
 Mokvi Gospels

Notes

References 

12th-century illuminated manuscripts
Georgian manuscripts
12th-century biblical manuscripts
12th century in the Kingdom of Georgia
History of Abkhazia